Morgan Bulkeley Brainard (January 8, 1879 - August 28, 1957) was an American attorney, insurance executive, and book collector. He served as president of Aetna from 1922 to 1956, following his uncle Morgan Bulkeley. Brainard was a director of the New York, New Haven and Hartford Railroad until his resignation in 1955.

He and Eleanor Stuart Moffat married on 27 April 1905. He had five children.

External links 

Morgan B. Brainard at Find a Grave

1879 births
1957 deaths

References